Helion may refer to:

People and characters
Helion (magister officiorum) (5th century)
Hélion de Villeneuve (c. 1270 – 1346), medieval knight
Jean Hélion (1904–1987), French painter
Helion, character in John C. Wright's trilogy The Golden Age

Groups, companies, organizations
 Helion Energy, an American company pursuing fusion power
Helion Lodge
Helion (publisher), a Polish publisher.

Other uses
Helion (chemistry), helium nucleus
Helion (meteoroid), meteoroids that seemingly coming out of the Sun

See also

Hellion (disambiguation)
Helium (disambiguation)
Helon (disambiguation)
Hel (disambiguation)